The economy of Indianapolis is centered on the City of Indianapolis and Marion County within the context of the larger Indianapolis metropolitan area. The Indianapolis–Carmel–Anderson, IN MSA, had a gross domestic product (GDP) of $134 billion in 2015. The top five industries were: finance, insurance, real estate, rental, and leasing ($30.7B), manufacturing ($30.1B), professional and business services ($14.3B), educational services, health care, and social assistance ($10.8B), and wholesale trade ($8.1B). Government, if it had been a private industry, would have ranked fifth, generating $10.2 billion.

Compared to Indiana as a whole, the Indianapolis metropolitan area has a lower proportion of manufacturing jobs and a higher concentration of jobs in wholesale trade; administrative, support, and waste management; professional, scientific, and technical services; and transportation and warehousing. The city's major exports include pharmaceuticals, motor vehicle parts, medical equipment and supplies, engine and power equipment, and aircraft products and parts. According to the Bureau of Labor Statistics, the region's unemployment rate was 2.8 percent in May 2019.

Three Fortune 500 companies are based in the city: health insurance company Elevance Health; pharmaceutical company Eli Lilly and Company; and agricultural chemical company Corteva. The Indianapolis metropolitan statistical area is also home to five Fortune 1000 companies: financial services holding company CNO Financial Group; auctioneer KAR Global; hydrocarbon manufacturer Calumet Specialty Products Partners; pharmaceutical company Elanco; automotive transmission manufacturer Allison Transmission; and real estate investment trust Simon Property Group.

Other notable companies based in the Indianapolis metropolitan area include: law firm and lobbyist Barnes & Thornburg; real estate investment trust Duke Realty; media conglomerate Emmis Communications; retailers Finish Line, Herff Jones, and Lids; financial services holding company OneAmerica Financial Partners, Inc.; airline holding company Republic Airways; contract research corporation Envigo; and fast food chains Noble Roman's and Steak 'n Shake.

History

Notable bids
In 1991, United Airlines selected Indianapolis International Airport for a $1 billion (equivalent to $ billion in ) maintenance operations center after a competitive bidding process involving more than 90 cities. State and local officials agreed to subsidize United's costs by providing nearly $300 million (equivalent to $ million in ) in tax credits and other incentives in exchange for thousands of high-wage jobs by 2004. Following United's filing for Chapter 11 bankruptcy protection in 2002, the  Indianapolis Maintenance Center closed in 2003. According to the Indianapolis Business Journal, "records are hard to come by, but during United's glory days, it is believed to have employed as many as 3,000 people at IMC [Indianapolis Maintenance Center]"—short of the 6,300 jobs United committed to in 1991.

Indianapolis submitted a bid to lure Amazon's HQ2 in 2017. In 2018, the company shortlisted Indianapolis as one of 20 finalists from a pool of 238 bids.

Foreign trade
Since 1981, the Indianapolis Airport Authority has overseen the Greater Indianapolis Foreign Trade Zone, Inc. (FTZ 72) (d/b/a INzone), a federal Foreign-Trade Zone encompassing 41 Central Indiana counties. In 2018, the World Trade Centers Association approved the city's request to establish a local World Trade Center organization.

Distribution and logistics

Indianapolis' central location and extensive highway and rail infrastructure have positioned Indianapolis as an important logistics center. According to the Indy Chamber, the region was home to some 4,300 establishments employing nearly 110,000 in 2020.

Amazon has a major presence in the Indianapolis metropolitan area, employing 9,000 across eight fulfillment centers: two in Indianapolis (IND4 and IND8); two in Plainfield (IND2 and IND5); two in Whitestown (IND1 and XUSE); and one each in Greenfield (MQJ1) and Greenwood (IND9). The city is home to FedEx Express's National Hub which employs 7,000 workers in sorting, distribution, and shipping at Indianapolis International Airport. The airport ranks among the ten busiest U.S. airports in terms of air cargo throughput. Other notable logistics companies located in the region include Ingram Micro (1,300) and Venture Logistics (1,150).

Indianapolis is a hub for CSX Transportation, home to its division headquarters, an intermodal terminal, and classification yard (in the suburb of Avon). Amtrak's Beech Grove Shops, in the enclave of Beech Grove, serve as its primary heavy maintenance and overhaul facility, while the Indianapolis Distribution Center is the company's largest material and supply terminal.

Cummins, based in Columbus, Indiana, expanded its footprint to Indianapolis in 2017. The Fortune 500 company opened its Global Distribution Business unit in downtown Indianapolis, employing 350 workers.

Financial services

Banking
From the mid-1950s through the late-1980s, American Fletcher National Bank (AFNB), Indiana National Bank (later known as INB Financial Corporation), and Merchants National Corporation were among the three largest banks in the city. Through the 1990s and 2000s, a series of acquisitions claimed the three Indianapolis-based companies. American Fletcher was acquired by Bank One Corporation in 1987 (succeeded in 2004 by Chase Bank); INB Financial Corporation was acquired by the National Bank of Detroit in 1992 (also succeeded by Chase Bank in 2004); and Merchants National Corporation was acquired by National City Corporation in 1992 (succeeded by PNC Financial Services in 2008). Chase maintains a large local presence, with 1,700 employees and local FDIC deposits totaling $13.6 billion, dwarfing all other financial institutions in Central Indiana.

Insurance

Elevance Health, one of three Fortune 500 companies headquartered in Indianapolis, employs more than 2,600 at the L. Ben Lytle Center. Elevance is the largest for-profit managed care company in the Blue Cross Blue Shield Association, providing healthcare coverage to more than 42 million policyholders. It is also the largest publicly traded company based in Indiana, with revenue of $122 billion in 2020.

OneAmerica Financial Partners employs 1,000 at its downtown Indianapolis headquarters in OneAmerica Tower. OneAmerica, founded in the city as American United Life (AUL) in 1877, is the second-largest privately held company in Indiana, with revenue of $2.7 billion in 2020. Carmel-based CNO Financial Group provides life insurance, annuity, and supplemental health insurance products to more than four million U.S. customers. Its headquarters employs 1,200.

Life sciences and healthcare
Indianapolis anchors one of the largest life sciences clusters in the U.S., notably in the subsectors of drugs and pharmaceuticals and agricultural feedstock and chemicals. Life sciences employ between 21,200 and 28,700 among nearly 350 companies located in the region. Indianapolis is also a hub for academic medicine and health sciences research, home to such institutions as the Indiana University School of Medicine, School of Nursing, and School of Dentistry; Indiana University Health; Marian University College of Osteopathic Medicine and Leighton School of Nursing; and the American College of Sports Medicine.

According to a 2021 report commissioned by BioCrossroads, Central Indiana's life sciences and healthcare sector generates nearly $84 billion in total economic output and supports more than 331,000 jobs throughout the region.

Agricultural feedstock and chemicals
In 2020, the Indianapolis–Carmel–Anderson metropolitan statistical area (MSA) ranked eighth among large MSAs in the U.S. for employment concentration in the agricultural feedstock and chemicals sector. According to the Indy Chamber, agribusiness employs more than 16,000 throughout the region. Corteva, one of three Fortune 500 companies headquartered in Indianapolis, is the region's largest employer in this sector, with about 1,500 jobs at the company's Indianapolis Global Business Center.

Drugs and pharmaceuticals

In 2020, the Indianapolis–Carmel–Anderson metropolitan statistical area (MSA) had the sixth-highest employment concentration in the drugs and pharmaceuticals sector, rising to second among large MSAs (after the Durham–Chapel Hill MSA).

Indianapolis' life sciences sector is dominated by Eli Lilly and Company, founded by Eli Lilly in 1876. In 2019, the multinational pharmaceutical company was among the largest public companies in the world with revenue topping $22 billion and a global workforce of more than 33,000. Eli Lilly is one of three Fortune 500 companies headquartered in Indianapolis and is the city's largest non-governmental employer with a workforce totaling nearly 11,000 in research and development, manufacturing, and executive administration. The company is deeply rooted in the city's civic and philanthropic fabric. Established in 1937 by Josiah K. Lilly Sr. and his two sons, Eli and Joe, the Lilly Endowment has grown into one of the world's wealthiest charitable foundations, with assets totaling more than $15 billion.

Elanco Animal Health, a pharmaceutical company that produces medicines and vaccinations for pets and livestock, announced plans in 2020 to invest $300 million in establishing its global headquarters in downtown Indianapolis. The company spun-off from Eli Lilly in 2019.

Other notable companies in the region include Novo Nordisk's Research Center Indianapolis, Inc. (NNRCII), established in 2015, and Century Pharmaceuticals, founded in the city in 1966. In 2020, multinational pharmaceutical company Novartis announced plans to open a manufacturing plant in Indianapolis.

Medical devices and equipment
Beckman Coulter's Life Sciences division is headquartered in Indianapolis and employs more than 500 in the development and production of precision instruments. In 2015, Cook Regentec (a subsidiary of Bloomington, Indiana-based Cook Group) was founded in the city to develop tools and technology for regenerative medicine, immunotherapy, and 3D bioprinting. In 2020, Cook Group's Cook Medical division announced plans to locate a plant in Indianapolis to manufacture medical devices.

Research, testing, and medical laboratories
Roche Diagnostics Corporation is among the largest employers in Indianapolis, with a workforce of 4,500 at its North American headquarters on the city's northeast side. Other notable employers in the sector include contract research organizations Envigo (based in the city) and Labcorp Drug Development (formerly Convance).

In 2020, the National Institutes of Health (NIH) awarded grants totaling $213 million to the Indiana University School of Medicine to further research, notably in the fields of Alzheimer's disease and pediatrics. Combining grants across several disciplines, the school ranked fifth in the country in funding from the National Institute on Aging. The school ranks 14th among public medical schools, and 29th overall in total NIH funds awarded nationally.

Formed in 2013, the Indiana Biosciences Research Institute (IBRI) is a nonprofit research and technology organization based in Indianapolis that serves as a conduit between the state's research universities and life science industries. The IBRI is the first industry-led collaborative life sciences research institute in the U.S., focusing on diabetes, metabolic disease, and poor nutrition.

Healthcare
In 2021, nearly 130,000 Central Indiana residents were employed in healthcare. Indianapolis is home to Indiana University Health, the state's largest healthcare system, with a workforce of 36,000 across 16 hospitals. Community Health Network is another nonprofit hospital system based in the city, employing 16,000 between nine hospitals and 15 urgent care clinics throughout the region. Eskenazi Health is the city's public healthcare system, employing more than 4,500 at Sidney & Lois Eskenazi Hospital and 30 outpatient service sites, receiving nearly 1 million outpatient visits annually.

St. Louis-based Ascension, among the largest nonprofit private healthcare systems in the U.S., employs about 7,100 in Central Indiana, with nearly 2,000 staffed beds and 4 million outpatient visits. Mishawaka, Indiana-based Franciscan Health, another nonprofit private healthcare system, has a regional workforce of 5,300 and 600 staffed beds.

Manufacturing

Founded in 1915, Allison Transmission designs and produces commercial duty automatic transmissions and hybrid propulsion systems. The Indianapolis headquarters and manufacturing facilities employs 2,500. Rolls-Royce North America, a subsidiary of United Kingdom-based Rolls-Royce Holdings, dates its local presence to the establishment of the Allison Engine Company in 1915. Its Indianapolis Operations Center has a workforce of 4,000 in aircraft engine development and manufacturing. Other major industrial employers include Allegion (1,300) and Raytheon Technologies (1,000).

Historically, manufacturing has been a critical component of Indianapolis' economic landscape; however, deindustrialization since the mid-20th century has significantly impacted the city's workforce. Between 1990 and 2012, approximately 26,900 manufacturing jobs were lost in the city as it continued diversification efforts and transitioned to a service economy. Indianapolis is typically considered part of the Rust Belt, a region of the Northeastern and Midwestern U.S. beleaguered by industrial and population decline. In 2016, Carrier Corporation announced the closure of its Indianapolis plant, moving 1,400 manufacturing jobs to Mexico. Other major manufacturers with a former presence in Indianapolis include RCA (later Technicolor SA) and Western Electric.

Automotive industry

Once home to 60 automakers, Indianapolis rivaled Detroit as a center of automobile manufacturing in the early 20th century. The Big Three automakers of the U.S.—Ford Motor Company, General Motors, and Chrysler—all had a major manufacturing plants in the city until the 2000s.

Defunct
American Motor Car Company (1906–1913)
Chrysler Indianapolis Foundry (1890–2005)
Cole Motor Car Company (1909–1925)
Dusenberg (1919–1937)
Ford Motor Company Indianapolis Branch Assembly Plant (1957–2008)
General Motors Indianapolis Metal Center (1930–2011)
H. C. S. Motor Car Company (1919–1927)
LaFayette Motors (1919–1922)
Marmon Motor Car Company (founded as Nordyke Marmon & Company in 1851) (1905–1933)
National Motor Vehicle Company (1900–1924)
Navistar International PurePower / Indianapolis Casting Corp. (1937–2015)
Premier Motor Manufacturing Company (1903–)
Stutz Motor Company (1911–1935)
Wheeler–Schebler Carburetor Company (1902–1987)

Real estate
Indianapolis serves as headquarters for three of the largest real estate investment trusts in the U.S., Simon Property Group, Duke Realty, and Kite Realty Group. Duke Realty manages a portfolio of 550 logistics facilities, primarily used for distribution or e-commerce.

Retail
Two national retailers are based in Indianapolis. Founded in 1976, Finish Line, Inc. operates more than 500 athletic apparel stores throughout the U.S. The company was acquired as a subsidiary of United Kingdom-based JD Sports in 2018. Founded in 1995, Lids specializes in athletic headwear with more than 1,100 stores throughout the U.S. and Canada.

Department stores

 H. P. Wasson and Company (1874–1980)
 L. S. Ayres (1872–2006)
 L. Strauss & Co. (1853–1993)
 William H. Block Co. (1874–1987)

Shopping malls
Castleton Square is a super-regional mall located on the city's northeast side. Castleton opened in 1972 as the largest enclosed shopping mall in Indiana, boasting  of gross leasable area, 130 stores, including five anchor tenants.

In recent years, Circle Centre has struggled with the departures of its two anchor tenants.

The Fashion Mall at Keystone opened on the city's north side in 1973 and has since become the region's upscale shopping destination, boasting 120 specialty stores and restaurants covering  of gross leasable area.

Glendale Town Center, also on the city's north side, opened in 1958 as the region's first suburban shopping mall. The center was designed by famed shopping mall architect Victor Gruen. After years of diminishing revenue and competition from nearby Castleton and The Fashion Mall, Glendale was largely remodeled into an open-air power center in the mid-2000s, covering  of gross leasable area.

Located on the northwest side of the city, the  Lafayette Square opened in 1968 as a super-regional mall but has experienced decline since the mid-2000s. In 2020, Lafayette Square was 60% occupied after the departure of several national anchor tenants.

Washington Square, located on the city's far east side, is a super-regional mall opened in 1974. Similar to Lafayette Square, Washington Square has experienced the loss of several national anchor tenants and declining performance in recent years.

Other major shopping malls in the region include lifestyle centers Clay Terrace (2004) and Hamilton Town Center (2008) to the north of Indianapolis in Hamilton County; super-regional mall Greenwood Park (1967) to the south in Johnson County; and lifestyle center The Shops at Perry Crossing (2005) in Hendricks County to the southwest of Indianapolis.

Technology
According to real estate tracking firm CBRE Group, Indianapolis ranks among the fastest high-tech job growth areas in the U.S. The metropolitan area is home to 28,500 information technology-related jobs at such companies as Angi, Formstack, Genesys, Hubstaff, Infosys, Ingram Micro, and Salesforce Marketing Cloud.

Indianapolis-based ExactTarget, a provider of digital marketing automation and analytics software services, was co-founded in 2000 by local entrepreneurs, Chris Baggot, Scott Dorsey, and Peter McCormick. In 2013, the company was acquired by Salesforce for $2.5 billion. Salesforce has the largest workforce of local tech firms, employing about 2,100 in Indianapolis. In 2016, the company purchased naming rights to Salesforce Tower in downtown Indianapolis, the tallest building in Indiana.

Tourism and hospitality

The hospitality industry is an increasingly vital sector of the local economy. According to Visit Indy, 28.8 million visitors generated $5.4 billion in 2017, the seventh straight year of record growth. In 2015, the hospitality and tourism industry employed 77,800 people in the region.

Indianapolis has long been a sports tourism destination, but has more recently relied on conventions. The Indiana Convention Center (ICC) and Lucas Oil Stadium are considered mega convention center facilities, with a combined  of exhibition space. ICC is connected to 12 hotels and 4,700 hotel rooms, the most of any U.S. convention center. In 2008, the facility hosted 42 national conventions with an attendance of 317,815; in 2014, it hosted 106 for an attendance of 635,701. Since 2003, Indianapolis has hosted Gen Con, one of the largest gaming conventions in North America.

See also

Economy of Indiana
Rust Belt

External links

Central Indiana Corporate Partnership
Indy Chamber

References

Economy of Indianapolis